Anthony Dod Mantle,  (born 14 April 1955) is a British cinematographer and still photographer. He won the Academy Award and BAFTA Award for Best Cinematography for Slumdog Millionaire (2008). Other accolades include two Bodil Awards, two European Film Awards, and four Robert Awards.

Dod Mantle is considered a pioneer of digital filmmaking through his collaborations with directors Lars von Trier, Thomas Vinterberg and Danny Boyle, where he popularized the use of "action-style" handheld cameras over traditional, stationary 35mm rigs.
A veteran of Dogme 95, he is heavily influenced by the cinéma vérité film movement. He is a member of the British, Danish, and American Society of Cinematographers, and resides in Copenhagen.

Career
Dod Mantle directed photography on three Dogme 95 films and the first two episodes of Wallander. He used the Red One digital camera on Wallander, the first British television production to do so. He won the British Academy Television Craft Award for Photography & Lighting (Fiction/Entertainment) for his work on the series and was nominated for a RTS Craft & Design Award for Lighting, Photography & Camera—Photography—Drama. He was also cinematographer on Slumdog Millionaire (Danny Boyle, 2008), for which he won the Academy Award for Best Cinematography in 2009. Dod Mantle is included in the book Conversations with Cinematographers by David A Ellis.

On 19 November 2016, during the Camerimage festival, Anthony Dod Mantle received the Brown Frog award for his cinematography on Snowden.

Dod Mantle lives with his family in Copenhagen, Denmark.

Style and technique
Dod Mantle helped pioneer the use of digital cinematography with his early use of home-quality DV in The Celebration, and eventually won an Academy Award for Best Cinematography for his work on Slumdog Millionaire, the first time that award went to a film shot digitally.

Dod Mantle has also experimented with extreme slow motion with high speed cameras in films like Antichrist and Dredd.

Filmography

Film

Television

Documentary films

Awards and nominations

References

External links 

1955 births
Living people
Best Cinematographer Academy Award winners
Best Cinematography BAFTA Award winners
Best Cinematographer Bodil Award winners
British cinematographers
British emigrants to Denmark
European Film Award for Best Cinematographer winners